Agrotis characteristica is a moth of the family Noctuidae. It is found in Ukraine, the southern Urals, western Siberia, the Altai mountains, the Sayan Mountains, Transbaikal, Mongolia, northern China (Ordos, Hotan) and the Korean Peninsula.

References

External links 
 Fauna Europaea

Agrotis
Moths of Europe
Moths of Asia
Moths described in 1892